is a Japanese former professional shogi player who achieved the rank of 8-dan.

Shogi professional
Hashimoto was granted an official leave of absence from active play from October 1, 2020, until March 31, 2021 for personal reasons by the Japan Shogi Association. On April 2, 2021, he informed the  that he had decided to retire altogether as an active professional shogi player, and the JSA announced later that day that it had accepted Hashimoto's retirement request.

Resignation from JSA
On November 2, 2022, Hashimoto notified the JSA of his intention to resign as a member for personal reasons effective immediately and submitted his formal resignation papers. The JSA acknowledged his request and announced he was no longer a member later that same day. Hashimoto subsequently explained his reasons for resigning via his YouTube channel and on Twitter stating that he did not want his involvement in a custody dispute with his wife over his young daughter and his public criticism of the Japanese government regarding its position on parental child abduction to adversely impact the JSA in any way.

Promotion history
The promotion history for Hashimoto is as follows:
 6-kyū: 1994
 1-dan: 1996
 4-dan: April 1, 2001
 5-dan: February 24, 2005
 6-dan: April 1, 2006
 7-dan: September 22, 2006
 8-dan: February 3, 2012

References

External links
ShogiHub: Professional Player Info · Hashimoto, Takanori

Japanese shogi players
Living people
Retired professional shogi players
Professional shogi players from Ishikawa Prefecture
1983 births